This is a list of what are intended to be the notable top hotels by country, five or four star hotels, notable skyscraper landmarks or historic hotels which are covered in multiple reliable publications. It should not be a directory of every hotel in every country:

Falkland Islands
Malvina House Hotel, Port Stanley

Faroe Islands
Hotel Føroyar, Tórshavn

Fiji
 Grand Pacific Hotel, Suva
 Shangri-La's Fijian Resort, Yanuca

Finland

 Hotel Ilves, Tampere
 Hotel Kämp, Helsinki
 Hotel Savonia, Kuopio
 Hotel Tammer, Tampere
 Hotel Torni, Helsinki
 Omenahotelli
 Palace Hotel, Helsinki
 Hotel Torni Tampere, Tampere

France

 Anjodi (barge)
 Beat Hotel, Paris
 Carlton Cannes, Cannes
 Castille Paris, Paris
 Château de l'Île, Ostwald near Strasbourg
 Enchanté (barge)
 Grand-Hôtel du Cap-Ferrat, Saint-Jean-Cap-Ferrat
 Grand Hotel Moderne, Lourdes
 Hôtel Au Manoir Saint Germain des Prés, Paris
 Hotel Belvédère du Rayon Vert
 Hotel Concorde La Fayette, Paris
 Hôtel Costes, Paris
 Hôtel de Crillon, Paris
 Hotel des Trois Colleges, Paris
 Hotel du Cap, Antibes
 Hôtel du Palais, Biarritz
 Hôtel Fouquet's Barrière, Paris
 Hotel George V, Paris, Paris
 Hotel La Louisiane, Paris
 Hôtel Le Bristol Paris, Paris
 Hôtel Lutetia, Paris
 Hôtel Martinez, Cannes
 Hôtel Meurice, Paris
 Hôtel Meurice de Calais, Calais
 Hotel Negresco, Nice
 Hôtel Raphael, Paris
 Hôtel Regina, Paris
 Hôtel Ritz Paris, Paris
 Hôtel de Soissons, Paris (historical)
 La Belle Epoque (barge)
 La Renaissance (barge)
 L'Art de Vivre (barge)
 La Voile d'Or, Saint-Jean-Cap-Ferrat
 Le Chabichou, Courchevel, Savoie
 L'Hôtel, Paris
 L'Impressionniste (barge)
 Magna Carta (barge)
 Maison Pic, Valence, Drôme
 Majestic, Cannes
 Majestic Hôtel-Spa, Paris
 Noga Hilton, Cannes
 Normandy Barrière, Deauville
 Nymphea (barge)
 Palais de la Méditerranée, Nice
 Pershing Hall, Paris
 Plaza Athénée, Paris
 Rosa (barge)
 Royal Picardy (barge)
 Saint Louis (barge)
 Savoir Faire (barge)
 The Westin Paris - Vendôme, Paris

F